Nemapogon defrisiensis is a moth of the family Tineidae. It is found in the Russian Far East.

References

Moths described in 1964
Nemapogoninae